In Retrospect is an album by American jazz pianist Mal Waldron recorded in 1982 and originally released by the Japanese Baybridge label.

Track listing
 "All Alone" (Irving Berlin) – 7:30 
 "Blue Monk" (Thelonious Monk) – 6:13
 "I Can't Get Started" (Ira Gershwin, Vernon Duke) – 7:36    
 "Oleo" (Sonny Rollins) – 11:14   
 "Straight, No Chaser" (Monk) – 5:36 
Recorded at the Tecichiku Kaikan Studio, in Tokyo, Japan, on April 23, 1982

Personnel
 Mal Waldron — piano 
 Akira Miyazawa — tenor saxophone (2-5), flute (1)
 Isao Suzuki — bass
 Hironobu Fujisawa — drums

References

Mal Waldron albums
1982 albums